Alasdair Locke is a British businessman. He is the former chairman of the Scottish oil services company Abbot Group, which has rigs in Africa (Libya), the North Sea, Sakhalin Island, and other areas. He was designated Scotland Overall and Master Entrepreneur Of The Year in 1999, and received the International Business Achievement Award from the Scottish Business Achievement Award Trust in 2007.

Locke holds a degree in History and Economics from the University of Oxford.

His career started in investment banking with Citigroup in 1974, where he specialised in shipping and oil. 

Locke stepped down as Executive Chairman of Abbot Group in November 2009. He reportedly had interest in both development and the insurance sector, which he said he would maintain.

In 2019 Locke and his stepson Alex Christou co-founded Glenrinnes Distillery, which is located in Glenrinnes, Scotland. In July 2019, Locke and his stepson introduced Organic Speyside Vodka and Organic Speyside Gin, backed by an investment of £4 million.

References

Scottish businesspeople
Living people
Year of birth missing (living people)